Mandiru or Mandirow may refer to:
 Mandiru, Chabahar
 Mandirow, Qasr-e Qand